Padmanabhan Ravindran (14 November 1922 – 13 November 1997) or P. Ravindran was an Indian politician who was the Minister for Industries, Labour and Forests in Kerala from 1 November 1969 to 3 August 1970. He was the secretary of the CPI Legislature Party from 1967 to 69. Ravindran was imprisoned many times for political reasons. He also chaired as the Chairman and Managing Director of Janayugom Newspaper, Prabhatham Printers and Publishing Company. He has played a major role in building the party cadre in the state of Kerala and received the Sadanandan Award for the Best Co-operator.

Ravindran became the MLA of Paravur constituency (now known as Chathannoor assembly constituency) during the Travancore-Cochin assembly elections held in 1951 and 1954. After the dissolution of Paravur constituency, he contested from Eravipuram during the general assembly election of 1957 and the interim election held in 1960. Ravindran represented Chathannoor constituency in Kerala assembly in 1967, 1970, 1987 and 1996.

On 13 November 1997, a day before his 75th birthday, Ravindran died when he was in the position of Chathannoor MLA

Electoral history

References

1922 births
Communist Party of India politicians from Kerala
Malayali politicians
Kerala politicians
Politicians from Kollam district
People from Kollam district
Kerala MLAs 1957–1959
Kerala MLAs 1960–1964
Kerala MLAs 1967–1970
Kerala MLAs 1970–1977
Kerala MLAs 1987–1991
Kerala MLAs 1996–2001
1997 deaths